Big Bad Wolf Books (The Big Bad Wolf Book Sale or BBW Books) is a Malaysian book fair frequently held in Malaysia, Indonesia, Myanmar, Pakistan, the Philippines, Sri Lanka, Taiwan, Thailand and the United Arab Emirates. The books were majorly taken from the stocks of BookXcess, a book store dealing in excess or remaindered books from international distributors. The Sale was the brainchild of BookXcess founders Andrew Yap and Jacqueline Ng. It was first held on 13–18 May 2009 for 5 days at Dataran Hamodal, Petaling Jaya.

The book fair sells all kind of books genres, for example fiction, non-fiction, novels, literature, children's literature and young adult fiction. It also sells merchandise including collectible books and posters, wallpaper, movie posters, tin-plated signs and their own merchandise.

Fairs held

Gallery

References

External links 

 Official website
 Thai language
 Indonesian language
 
 BookXcess website

Book fairs in Malaysia
Malaysian literature